Lesbian, gay, bisexual, and transgender (LGBT) persons in Grenada may face legal challenges not experienced by non-LGBT residents. The penal code makes same-sex acts on Grenada proper illegal with a punishment up to 10 years in prison, it also does not address discrimination or harassment on the account of sexual orientation or gender identity, nor does it recognize same sex unions in any form, whether it be marriage or partnerships. Household headed by same-sex couples are also not eligible for any of the same rights given to opposite-sex married couples.

Legality of same-sex sexual acts 

Homosexuality is illegal in Grenada proper. Under the Grenada Criminal Code, Section 431, the offence of “unnatural crime” is committed by way of sexual intercourse per anum, i.e., anal penetration. Such offence is punishable by imprisonment for ten years.

The Criminal Code does not specify the ‘penetrating’ object, although by reliance on the common law, the penetrating object is the penis. The offence is committable by male person with/to male person and/or male person with/to female. The offence cannot, however, be committed by two female persons. However, in section 7, the criminal law prohibits "Committing grossly indecent act; is stated in gender-neutral terms. By implication it
covers both opposite-sex and same-sex acts. The act of gross indecency must be
committed wilfully and in public." Under this section female homosexuality is illegal under public indecency laws.

In May 2013, the president of the Senate of Grenada called the island to reconsider its ban on same-sex sexual relationships and said that “the day is fast approaching” for Grenada and other Caribbean countries to repeal their sodomy laws.

Discrimination protections 
There are no explicit clause on equality or protection of privacy in the Grenada Constitution of 1973.

Grenadan law does not address discrimination or harassment on the account of sexual orientation or gender identity.

Summary table

See also

Politics of Grenada
LGBT rights in the Commonwealth of Nations
LGBT rights in the Americas
LGBT rights by country or territory

References

Grenada
Law of Grenada
Society of Grenada
Grenada
Grenada